Released in 2000, Makin' Love Is Good for You is the thirty-eighth B. B. King studio album.

Like the similar Blues on the Bayou (which also contained a version of "You're on Top", but titled "Blues in G"), it combines blues covers and B.B. King originals, which are re-recordings of songs he had recorded earlier in his career. Three songs originally appeared on the 1960 album King of the Blues: "She's My Baby" had been the opening track under the title "I've Got a Right To Love My Baby", "Ain't Nobody Like My Baby" is a new recording of "Feel Like a Million", and "You're On Top" appears under its original title. "Peace of Mind" was originally a 1961 single. "Too Good To You Baby" is a remake of "The Wrong Road" from Blues in My Heart (released in 1963). "Actions Speak Louder Than Words" appeared on the 1963 release (The Soul of) B.B. King as "You Won't Listen".

As the re-titled tracks are credited to King alone, it's likely that this was done in order to not share royalties with the Bihari brothers.

Track listing 
"I Got to Leave This Woman" (Melvin Jackson)
"Since I Fell for You" (Buddy Johnson)
"I Know" (Barbara George)
"Peace of Mind" (Riley King, Joe Josea)
"Monday Woman" (Willie Mabon)
"Ain't Nobody Like My Baby" (Riley King)
"Makin' Love Is Good for You" (Tony Joe White)
"Don't Go No Farther" (Willie Dixon)
"Actions Speak Louder than Words" (Riley King)
"What You Bet" (Robert Taylor, George Williams)
"You're on Top" (Riley King, Sam Ling)
"Too Good to You Baby" (Riley King)
"I'm in the Wrong Business" (A.C. Reed)
"She's My Baby" (Riley King)
"It's Still Called the Blues" (Earl Forest, George Jackson, Robert Alton Miller) [bonus track on European and Japanese editions]
"My Gal Keeps Me Cryin'" (L.C. Frazier) [bonus track on Japanese edition]

Personnel 
B.B. King – lead guitar
James Bolden, Darrell Leonard, Stanley Abernathy – trumpet
Walter R. King, Melvin Jackson – saxophone
Calep Emphrey Jr. – drums
Leon Warren, John Porter – guitar
Michael Doster – bass guitar
James Toney, Tommy Eyre – keyboards
Joe Sublett – tenor saxophone
Tony Braunagel – percussion

References

2000 albums
B.B. King albums
MCA Records albums